"Electric Barbarella" is the 29th single by Duran Duran, and the first official single from the album Medazzaland.  In 1997, the single and album were released only in the United States; "Electric Barbarella" was not issued as a single in the UK until January 1999 on the back of the late 1998 release of the compilation album Greatest.

The band's previous single, "Out of My Mind", was another track from Medazzaland, but was released as a single from The Saint soundtrack album instead.

About the song
"Electric Barbarella" is a direct tribute to the 1968 Roger Vadim film Barbarella, from which the band took their name.

It has been touted as the first song available for digital purchase/download on the Internet, however, this is heavily disputed as songs had been available for download and purchase on the internet since 1992. Dozens of different mixes were created from the song.  A Dom T mix exclusive to the Internet was available for download in the US for 99 cents.  This pioneering move annoyed many American retailers as they saw it as infringing on their retail territory and they either refused to stock the album, or provided very little, or sometimes no, promotion of the disc.

Music video
The video, directed by photographer Ellen von Unwerth, involved a robot sex doll played by American model Myka Dunkle. Simon Le Bon stated during an interview with Carson Daly on Total Request Live that von Unwerth specifically requested to use Dunkle, despite the fact that the band had other models and friends, including Devon Aoki and Sophie Dahl (both of whom appear in the video's party scene), in mind due to her background as a dancer, and her ability to "do the mime that would actually make her appear to be a robot." The video had to be mildly censored before receiving airplay on MTV or VH1; by the time the modified video was delivered, the song had already fallen off the charts.

B-sides, bonus tracks and remixes
The b-side for "Electric Barbarella" was a mix of their previous single, "Out of My Mind".

Numerous remixes were issued on various promo releases and on the internet.

Remix list 
“Electric Barbarella” (Album Version) 5:16
“Electric Barbarella” (Edit) / (Radio Edit) 4:16
“Electric Barbarella” (Single Edit) 3:58
“Electric Barbarella” (Single Edit/No Solo) 4:00
“Electric Barbarella” (Tee's Club Mix) 5:50
“Electric Barbarella” (Tee's Speed Dub) 6:24
“Electric Barbarella” (Tee's Dance Mix) 6:09
“Electric Barbarella” (Tee's Radio Mix) / (Tee's Radio Edit) 4:04
“Electric Barbarella” (Tee's Capella) 2:13
“Electric Barbarella” (TNT In-House Mix) 5:18
“Electric Barbarella” (TNT Radio Mix) 3:23
“Electric Barbarella” (All Fired Up Mix) / (Dom T Remix) 7:09
“Electric Barbarella” (Internet Only Mix) / (Dom T Remix Edit) 4:16
“Electric Barbarella” (Barbarella Bonus Beats) 4:41
“Electric Barbarella” (The Americruiser Remix) 6:17
“Electric Barbarella” (The Yo Shorty Americruiser Remix) 5:05
“Electric Barbarella” (The Electric Sex Remix) 5:06
“Electric Barbarella” (The Electric Sex Instrumental Remix) 5:04

Formats and track listing

12": EMI. / 12ELEC 2000 United Kingdom 
 "Electric Barbarella" (Tee's Club Mix) – 5:54
 "Electric Barbarella" (Electric Sex Mix) – 5:02
 "Girls on Film" (Salt Tank Mix) – 6:27
 Released November 1998.

CD: EMI. / CDELEC 2000 United Kingdom 
 "Electric Barbarella" (Radio Edit) – 4:15
 "Girls on Film" (Tin Tin Out Radio mix) – 4:51
 "Electric Barbarella" (Tee's Radio Mix) – 4:05

 Released November 1998

MC: EMI. / TCELEC 2000 United Kingdom 
 "Electric Barbarella" (Radio Edit) – 4:15
 "Girls on Film" (Tin Tin Out Radio mix) – 4:51
 "Electric Barbarella" (Tee's Radio Mix) – 4:05

7": Capitol Records. / S7-724381972175 United States  
 "Electric Barbarella" (Album Version) – 5:19
 "Out of My Mind" (Album Version) – 4:20

12": Capitol Records. / Y 7243 8 58674 15 United States 
 "Electric Barbarella" (Tee's Club Mix) – 5:54 
 "Electric Barbarella" (Tee's Dance Mix) – 6:16 
 "Electric Barbarella" (All Fired Up Mix) – 7:12 
 "Electric Barbarella" (Barbarella Bonus Beats) – 4:49

12": Capitol Records. / SPRO 12098  (Promo) United States 
 "Electric Barbarella" (Tee's Club Mix) – 5:41
 "Electric Barbarella" (Tee's Speed Dub) – 6:15
 "Electric Barbarella" (Tee's Dance Mix) – 6:03
 "Electric Barbarella" (TNT In-House Mix) – 5:12
 "Electric Barbarella" (Tee's Capella) – 2:11

US promo 12" labelled "Todd Terry Remixes".

12": Capitol Records. / SPRO 7087 6 12098 15 (Promo) United States 
 "Electric Barbarella" (Tee's Dance Mix) – 6:03
 "Electric Barbarella" (TNT In-House Mix) – 5:12
 "Electric Barbarella" (Tee's Capella) – 2:11
 "Electric Barbarella" (Tee's Club Mix) – 5:41
 "Electric Barbarella" (Tee's Speed Dub) – 6:15

12": Capitol Records. / SPRO 7087 6 12097 16 (Promo) United States 
 "Electric Barbarella" (All Fired Up Mix) – 7:12
 "Electric Barbarella" (Barbarella Bonus Beats) – 4:49
 "Electric Barbarella" (Album Version) – 5:19
 "Electric Barbarella" (Radio Edit) – 4:15

12": Harvest. / SPRO 7087 6 12085 11 (Promo) United States 
 "Electric Barbarella" (Electric Sex Remix) – 5:02
 "Electric Barbarella" (Electric Sex Instrumental Remix) – 5:04
 "Electric Barbarella" (The Americruiser Remix) – 6:17
 "Electric Barbarella" (Yo Shorty Americruiser Remix) – 5:05

CD: Capitol Records. / C2 7243 8 58674 0 8 United States 
 "Electric Barbarella" (Album Version) – 5:15 
 "Electric Barbarella" (Tee's Club Mix) – 5:41 
 "Electric Barbarella" (All Fired Up Mix) – 7:09 
 "Out of My Mind" (Perfecto Mix) – 5:51 
 "Sinner and Saint" – 4:12 
 "Electric Barbarella Video" (Director's Cut) – 5:01
 Track 6 Video is in Quicktime format, 320x240, Apple Cinepak codec.

Download 
 "Electric Barbarella (Internet-only mix)" – 4:20 [Dom T. remix edit]
 "Electric Barbarella (Dom T Remix)" – 7:08

 First commercially downloadable song; sold for 99 cents.

Media references
The cosmetics company Hard Candy was preparing to launch a colour of nail polish named "Electric Barbarella" at the same time the single was released, but had to halt it because the proper permissions had not been received from the owners of the Barbarella name.

Chart positions
The song was released on 16 September in the United States, and peaked at No. 52 on the Billboard Hot 100 on 1 November and one year later reached No. 23 in UK singles charts.  Due to the debacle over its download release, temporary censoring of the music video and late release to other markets the single is generally considered to have under-performed.

Release history

Other appearances
Aside from the single, the song has also appeared on:
 Medazzaland (1997)
 Greatest (1998)

Personnel 
Duran Duran are:
 Nick Rhodes – keyboards
 Simon Le Bon – vocals
 Warren Cuccurullo – guitar, bass

Other credits 
 Anthony J. Resta – live drums

References

Duran Duran songs
1997 singles
Fictional gynoids
1997 songs
EMI Records singles
Songs written by Warren Cuccurullo
Songs written by Simon Le Bon
Songs written by Nick Rhodes
Songs about comics
Songs about fictional female characters
Music videos featuring gynoids